The rowing competition at the 2018 Central American and Caribbean Games was held from 20 to 23 July at Calima Lake.

Medal summary

Men's events

Women's events

Medal table

References

External links
2018 Central American and Caribbean Games – Rowing 

2018 Central American and Caribbean Games events
Central American and Caribbean Games
2018
Rowing in Colombia